Levi or Lévi is a Jewish surname. It is a transliteration of the Hebrew word לוי meaning "attached" or "joining". Another spelling of the name is Levy (or Lévy). According to Jewish tradition, people with the surname are Levites who can claim patrilineal descent from the Leviim of biblical times. In 2019, it was revealed as the second most common surname in Israel (after Cohen).

People with the surname
 Judah the Levi (c. 1075–1141), Spanish-Jewish physician, poet, and philosopher
 Alda Levi (1890–1950), Italian archaeologist and art historian
 Alexander Levi (1809–1893), French Jew who became the first foreigner to be naturalized in Iowa
 Beppo Levi (1875–1961), Italian mathematician
 Carlo Levi (1902–1975), Italian-Jewish painter, writer, activist, anti-fascist, and doctor
 Charles Levi, bassist of My Life with the Thrill Kill Kult
 Claude Lévi-Strauss (1908–2009), French anthropologist and ethnologist
 Clemente Pugliese Levi (1855–1936), Italian painter
 Daniel Lévi (born 1961), French singer, songwriter, composer, and pianist
 David Levi (disambiguation), several people
 Devon Levi (born 2001), Canadian ice hockey player
 Doro Levi (1899–1991), archaeologist
 Edward Hirsch Levi (1911–2000), American academic leader, scholar, and statesman
 Éliphas Lévi (1810–1875), French occult author and purported magician
 Eric Lévi (born 1955), French musician
 Eugenio Elia Levi (1883–1917), Italian mathematician
 Friedrich Wilhelm Levi (1888–1966), German mathematician
 Gerson Levi-Lazzaris (born 1979), Brazilian ethnoarchaeologist
 H. W. Levi (1921–2014), German professor of zoology and arachnologist
 Hermann Levi (1839–1900), German-Jewish orchestral conductor
 Howard Levi (1916–2002), American mathematician
 Ijahman Levi (born 1946), Jamaican reggae musician
 Joseph Levi (1924–2019), American businessman and politician
 Kate Everest Levi (1859–1939), American social worker
 Leo N. Levi (1856–1904), American lawyer and communal worker
 London Levi, 2009 America's Next Top Model contestant
 Leone Levi (1821–1888), English jurist and statistician
 Moshe Levi (1936–2008), IDF Chief of Staff
 Nimrod Levi (born 1995), Israeli basketball player
 Paul Levi (1883–1930), German-Jewish Communist leader
 Paul Levi (picture framer) (1919–2008), German-born picture framer in the UK
 Peter Levi (1931–2000), English poet and professor of poetry
 Primo Levi (1919–1987), Italian chemist and writer
 Pop Levi (born 1977), English singer, multi-instrumentalist, record producer and filmmaker
 Richard Levi (born 1988), South African cricketer
 Rita Levi-Montalcini (born 1909), Italian neurologist
 Sara Levi-Tanai (1911–2005), Israeli choreographer
 Tullio Levi-Civita (1873–1941) Italian mathematician
 Ya'akov Levi (born 1964), Israeli Olympic gymnast
 Yehuda Levi (born 1979), Israeli actor and male model
 Yoel Levi (born 1950), Romanian-Israeli musician and conductor
 Yohanan Levi (1901–1945), German linguist and historian
 Zachary Levi (born 1980), American actor

See also
 Levy (surname)

References

Jewish surnames
Hebrew-language surnames
Levite surnames